The 2012 CAA men's soccer tournament, known as the 2012 Virginia 529 CAA Men's Soccer Championship for sponsorship reasons, is the 30th edition of the CAA Men's Soccer Tournament, which determines the conference's automatic berth into the 2012 NCAA Division I Men's Soccer Championship. The tournament will be played at Drexel University in Philadelphia on the Vidas Athletic Center.

The Delaware Fighting Blue Hens are the defending champions.

Qualification

Bracket

Schedule 

The higher seed, as well as the home team, is listed on the right.

Play-in round

Semifinals

CAA Championship

Statistical leaders

References

External links 
 2012 CAA Men's Soccer Tournament

-
CAA Men's Soccer Tournament
CAA Men's Soccer Tournament
CAA Men's Soccer Tournament